The 2018 European Rugby Champions Cup Final was the final match in the 2017–18 European Rugby Champions Cup, and the twenty-third European club rugby final in general.

Irish club Leinster defeated French club Racing 92 in the final played in Bilbao, Spain — the first time it was contested outside one of the Six Nations countries.

Route to the final

Note: In all results below, the score of the finalist is given first (H: home; A: away).

Match

Summary
The game was played in wet conditions, which made passing and attacking play difficult for both teams. Early in the game Racing fly-half Pat Lambie was forced off the field with a knee injury, replaced by French international Rémi Talès. Racing recovered from this set back to score the first points of the game with Teddy Iribaren kicking a penalty. Leinster responded on 16 minutes when Johnny Sexton opened their account, also from a penalty. Iribaren reestablished Racing's lead five minutes later and Sexton responded just before half time, to send the teams into the break level on six points apiece.	

The teams were both unchanged for the second half, and the penalty tit-for-tat continued. Sexton was the first to strike in the second half with a converted effort on 53 minutes, before Iribaren missed and the teams remained level at 9–9 coming into the final 10 minutes of play. Iribaren kicked his fourth penalty of the day to give Racing back their three-point lead, but Leinster responded quickly with a penalty from captain Isa Nacewa. Nacewa scored another penalty with two minutes left to play to give Leinster the lead for the first time in the match. Racing won the kick off and worked down the field, looking for a drop goal to level the match again and bring play to extra time. With clock over 80 minutes the opportunity fell to Talès, who pulled his effort wide to the left to give Leinster their fourth European title.

Details

References

Final
2018
May 2018 sports events in Europe
Leinster Rugby matches
Racing 92 matches
Rugby union in the Basque Country (greater region)
International rugby union competitions hosted by Spain
2017–18 in Irish rugby union
2017–18 in French rugby union
2017–18 in Spanish rugby union
Sport in Bilbao